Pale may refer to:

Jurisdictions 
 Medieval areas of English conquest:
 Pale of Calais, in France (1360–1558)
 The Pale, or the English Pale, in Ireland 
Pale of Settlement, area of permitted Jewish settlement, western Russian Empire (1791–1917)

Geography

Africa
 Palé, town in Guinea
San Antonio de Palé, town on Annobon Island, Equatorial Guinea

Asia
 Burma
 Pale, Myanmar, town
 Pale Township 
India
 Pale, Dahanu, village
 Pale, Goa, census town

Europe
 Pale (Greece), ancient town in Kefalonia, today part of Lixouri, Greece
 Pale, Bosnia and Herzegovina, a town and municipality
 Palé, Hungary, a village
 Pāle parish, Latvia
 Pale River, Estonia
 Pale-Prača, Bosnia and Herzegovina, a municipality

Arts, entertainment, and media

Music
 Pale (album), a 1990 release of Toad the Wet Sprocket
 Pale (band), an Australian band formed in 1991
 The Pale (band), an Irish band formed in 1990 
 The Pale, renamed The Pale Pacific, an American indie rock band
 The Pale (EP), by William Control
 "Pale", a track by Within Temptation from The Silent Force

Other arts, entertainment, and media
Pale (Greyhawk), the Theocracy of the Pale, a fictional nation in the Dungeons and Dragons role-playing game
Pale Rider (1985), an American western film produced and directed by Clint Eastwood

Other uses
Pale (heraldry), a vertical mark running down the centre of a flag or shield
Pálē (in Greek: πάλη), the Greek name for ancient Greek wrestling
Palisade, a fence made from paling, sticks or logs sharpened on one end into "pales" with the other on or embedded into the ground

See also
Pail, a bucket
Paleness (disambiguation)
Beyond the Pale (disambiguation)